EMMA for Peace, or the Euro Mediterranean Music Academy, is an international Nonprofit organization for the promotion of peace through music diplomacy and education in Europe, Middle East and the Mediterranean region.

History

EMMA for Peace was founded by Paolo Petrocelli in 2012. In October 2013, EMMA for Peace was officially launched at the 13th World Summit of Nobel Peace Laureates in Warsaw, Poland.

Italian conductor Riccardo Muti has been named Honorary President of EMMA for Peace.

Activities

EMMA for Peace aims to promote music as a tool for diplomacy through collaborations with international institutional partners such as the UN organizations (particularly UNESCO, UNICEF and the UNHCR) and the World Summit of Nobel Peace Laureates. EMMA is also active in individual partner countries with the support of national institutions, as well as organizing concerts at major venues and festivals throughout the region.

EMMA for Peace and the World Summit of Nobel Peace Laureates

Under the patronage of UNESCO and the auspices of the Secretary General of the Council of Europe, EMMA for Peace organized in 2013 the inaugural concert of the 13th World Summit of Nobel Peace Laureates in Warsaw, featuring Polish Sinfonia Iuventus Orchestra conducted by John Axelrod.

EMMA for Peace and UNESCO

Since 2014, EMMA for Peace is engaged in promoting the International Jazz Day, organizing, co-organizing and supporting many editions initiatives and projects in Italy and abroad.

In 2015, EMMA for Peace participated at the official program for the celebration of 70th anniversary of UNESCO with an  institutional concert at Carnegie Hall in New York, featuring the Korean Chamber Orchestra, the UNESCO Artist for Peace Ino Mirkovich, the South Korean violinist Soyoung Yoon and the British singer Carly Paoli.

EMMA for Peace and UNICEF

In 2013, EMMA for Peace joined forces with UNICEF designing a music education program conceived to support Syrian children in refugee camps in Lebanon, Jordan and Turkey and promoting solidarity benefit concerts in Europe featuring Syrian musicians.

EMMA for Peace and UNHCR

In 2014, EMMA for Peace launched a joint project with UNHCR in Malta in support of young refugees of the Mediterranean.
Musicians from the Malta Youth Orchestra and young migrants came together for a powerful musical experience participating in a number of workshops where improvisation, collective lyric-writing and musical composition were the building blocks culminating in a public performance.

In 2018, EMMA for Peace organized a charity concert for Syrian refugees with UNHCR in Milan, as a result of a collaboration between Italian and Syrian artists.

EMMA for Peace and La Scala Theatre Academy

In 2014, EMMA for Peace facilitated a collaboration for the very first time between Cairo Opera House and La Scala Theatre of Milan organizing an Opera Gala concert in Cairo, featuring the participation of acclaimed young singers of La Scala Theatre Academy.
On this occasion, EMMA for Peace  presented “Opera for Peace” an educational project with the aim of bringing opera music and its related professions to both conservatoire students and young people in the refugee camps of Jordan, Lebanon, Egypt, Morocco, Palestine and Turkey.

EMMA for Peace and the European Union Youth Orchestra

In 2019, EMMA for Peace organized the very first concert of the European Union Youth Orchestra (EUYO) in Oman, presenting a special gala concert with Latvian Soprano Kristine Opolais, conducted by Vasily Petrenko at the Royal Opera House Muscat.

Music Diplomacy - Stories from the World 

In 2014, EMMA for Peace launched a global campaign for the promotion of music diplomacy.

In 2020, EMMA creates the first blog community dedicated to music diplomacy.

Artists
EMMA for Peace artists include:

Alessio Allegrini
Hiba Al Kawas
Aeham Ahmad
Nahel Al Halabi
Maias Alyamani
John Axelrod
Kinan Azmeh
Alessio Bax
Elisso Bolkvadze
Ezio Bosso
Franko Bozac
Michele Campanella
Gautier Capuçon
Achref Chargui
Zane Dalal
Ihab Darwish
Yousra Dhahbi
Armand Diangienda
Zade Dirani
Michalis Economou
Charlene Farrugia
David Fray
Andrea Griminelli
Jihae
Ayyub Guliyev
Malek Jandali
Ricky Kej
Marcel Khalife
Rami Khalife
Zvonimir Hacko
Mohammed Haddad
Amir Issaa
Tetsuji Honna
Miina Järvi (:et)
The Khoury Project
Katia and Marielle Labèque
Tasmin Little
Malta Philharmonic Orchestra (music organization)
Gianluca Marcianò
Cristian Marcia
Antoine Marguier
Aleksandar Markovic
Ino Mirkovic
Andrea Morricone
Nayer Nagui
Jamal Ouassini
Carly Paoli
Oliver Poole
Quartetto d’Archi della Scala
Alexander Romanovsky
Ksenija Sidorova
Vladimir Spivakov
Markus Stockhausen
Luis Szarán
Pejman Tadayon
United Nations Orchestra (music organization)
Miran Vaupotić
Karim Wasfi
Hirofumi Yoshida
Ruben Zahra

See also
 Cultural Diplomacy
 Paolo Petrocelli

References

Further reading
 New organisation set up to promote music education and cultural diplomacy. BBC Music Magazine, Retrieved 26 April 2015
 International organisation set up to promote music education and cultural understanding. The Strad, Retrieved 26 April 2015
 Music for Peace. BBC Music Magazine, Retrieved 26 April 2015

External links
 

Music organisations based in Italy
2013 establishments in Italy
Non-profit organisations based in Italy
Cultural diplomacy
International cultural organizations
Arts organizations established in 2013